Lha (Ԕ ԕ; italics: Ԕ ԕ) is a letter of the Cyrillic script. It is a cross-digraph of the Cyrillic letters El (Л л) and Kha (Х х); Л and Х.

Lha was used in the alphabet used in the 1920s for the Moksha language, where it represented the voiceless alveolar lateral .

Computer encoding

See also
Cyrillic characters in Unicode
Љ љ : Cyrillic letter Lje, a Serbian, Macedonian, and Montenegrin letter.
Ԉ ԉ : Cyrillic letter Komi Lje
Л л : Cyrillic letter El
ℒ ℓ : Latin letter Script L

References

Cyrillic letters